The Brünberg is a mountain of the Bernese Alps, overlooking the Grimselsee in the canton of Bern. It is composed of several summits, of which the highest has an elevation of 2,982 metres above sea level.

References

External links
 Brünberg on Hikr

Mountains of the Alps
Mountains of Switzerland
Mountains of the canton of Bern
Two-thousanders of Switzerland